Femme Fatales is an anthology television series, inspired by the men's magazine of the same name, produced by and aired on Cinemax from 2011 to 2012. Each episode features an antiheroic woman, intercut with softcore pornographic scenes. Lilith (Tanit Phoenix) introduces each episode Rod Serling-style and occasionally appears within the narrative. Some characters make encore appearances in later episodes. Unlike most shows that feature porn actors, Femme Fatales features mainstream actors, such as Richard Kind, Adam Goldberg, Paul Mazursky, Ryan Bittle, Robert LaSardo, Stephen Macht, William Gregory Lee, Dean Haglund, Charlie O'Connell,  Daniel Bess, Angus Scrimm, Carrie Genzel, Ellie Cornell, Neil Hopkins in season 1; and Antonio Sabàto Jr., Kyle Gass, Leilani Sarelle, Chris Mulkey, Scheana Shay, John Enos III, Vivica A. Fox, Sandra McCoy, Jeffrey Combs, Robert Picardo, Ashley Hamilton, Nikki Griffin, Eric Roberts, Kate Luyben, Steve Railsback, Paul Rae, Jes Macallan, Casper Van Dien, Jeff Fahey, and Betsy Rue in season 2.

Premise
Women find extraordinary ways of coping with their problems, channeling their survival instincts and bringing out their inner guile. The show is inspired by and styled in the tradition of pulp stories, film noir and graphic novels, and takes place in contemporary settings. Each episode is introduced by a mysterious and enigmatic host Lilith and features different casts and storylines, some of which are intertwined.

Cast

Main cast
 Tanit Phoenix as Lilith

Notable guest stars
 Ariauna Albright as Dream Woman
 Ana Alexander as Camille Gardner
 Sadie Alexandru as Janelle
 Crystal Allen as Rhonda Temple
 Mark A. Altman as the Voice of the Desk Clerk
 Catherine Annette as Tiffany
 Domiziano Arcangeli as Chaka
 Scott Bailey as Greg Cooper
 Carlee Baker as Beth Odets
 Cameron Bender as Tom Lomax
 Daniel Bess as Logan Cale
 Ryan Bittle as Archie Becker
 Philip Boyd as Nick
 Walker Brandt as Amy
 J.C. Brandy as Maxine
 Tiffany Brouwer as Holly Brown
 David Bygrave as Boyfriend
 Daniel Capellaro as Todd Voight
 Tina Casciani as Barbara
 Jeffrey Combs as the Voice of the Interrogator
 Rick Copp as Richard Hollis / Teacher
 Ellie Cornell as Detective Janet Wright
 Mark Costello as Detective Mitchum
 Marc Crumpton as Foster Prentiss
 Stephanie Danielson as Emily
 Kristen DeLuca as Beverly Dietrich
 Asher Deva as Ricardo
 James Devoti as Cam
 Andrew Dickler as R.J.
 Casper Van Dien as Joe Hallenbeck
 Danica Dillon as Caroline / Virginia
 Charles Divins as Dr. Troy
 Christine Donlon as Violet MacReady
 Sean Douglas as Pressman
 Daphnée Duplaix as Alexis
 Madison Dylan as Alexis
 Kiko Ellsworth as Detective Carter Judson
 John Enos III as Gil Flood
 Jeff Fahey as Detective McAllister
 Tammy Felice as Kim
 Gigi Feshold as Bebe
 Chanon Finley as Lisa Bannion
 Jon Fleming as Aaron
 Raymond Forchion as Judge Aldrich
 Bren Foster as Howard
 Vivica A. Fox as Dean Vera Rutledge
 Kyle Gass as Willoughby Flagler
 Carrie Genzel as Dr. Marlowe
 Diana Gettinger as Laurie
 Paul Green as Marvin Widmark
 Anne Lee Greene as Kendra Banks
 Ian Gregory as Charles McKendrick
 Nikki Griffin as Nicole Ryan
 Dean Haglund as Kip
 Ashley Hamilton as Devlin Grant
 Steve Richard Harris as Lex
 Jules Hartley as Molly Trevor
 Reggie Hayes as Kevin Freeman
 Erin Marie Hogan as Emily
 Neil Hopkins as Charles Solomon
 Stacy Stas Hurst as Jessica
 Adam Huss as Max Bailey
 Heidi James as Big Aggie
 Preston Jones as Aaron
 Tom Kirlin as Guard
 Kerry Knuppe as Daphne
 Joe Kraemer as Officer Taylor
 Steve Kriozere as Doctor
 Robert LaSardo as Laz Swan
 William Gregory Lee as Jimmy
 Kimo Leopoldo as Bodyguard
 Christian Levantino as Pete Greene
 Crystle Lightning as Candela
 Vedette Lim as Agent Pam
 Scott Logan as Jake Rutledge
 Sierra Love as Isabella Cregar
 Kate Luyben as Mary Mason
 Jes Macallan as Susan Voight
 Stephen Macht as Leland Ryan
 Jordan Madley as Rachel Worth
 Janelle Marra as Gloria
 Michael Masini as Chris Gunden
 Brady Matthews as Chris Wade
 Paul Mazursky as Warden Jeffries
 Sandra McCoy as Professor Kelsey Williams
 Geoff Meed as O'Brien
 Cristin Michele as Cynthia
 Mirtha Michelle as Lauren Coleston
 Anya Monzikova as Darla McKendrick
 Nikki Moore as Abigail Strauss
 Chris Mulkey as Bendix Darby
 Isaiah Mustafa as Raven
 Jo Newman as Jess Russell
 Ashley Noel as Matilda West / Dark Matilda West
 Charlie O'Connell as Jay Roma
 Ho-Sung Pak as Superstar Assassin (aka The Ghost) / Fight Trainer
 Melissa Paulo as Erida
 Moniqua Plante as Sara
 Robert Picardo as Hieronymus Hawks
 Will Poston as Rafe Daniels
 Shani Pride as Tatiana
 Nick Principe as Killer
 Tara Radcliffe as Joanne Terranova
 Paul Rae as Guard
 Steve Railsback as Dr. Daniel Duryea
 Geoff Reeves as Steve Mason
 Arloa Reston as Sharon
 Makinna Ridgway as Angelica
 Jennifer Roa as Norma Swanson
 Eric Roberts as David Bannion
 Tobi Rodriguez as Lucky Starr
 Annie Ruby as Susan
 Betsy Rue as Libra
 Joel Rush as Pecs
 Joe Sabatino as Iggy Bacardi
 Antonio Sabàto Jr. as Bart
 Leilani Sarelle as Veronica Flood
 Bryan Sato as Kentaro
 Donna W. Scott as Alicia Ryan
 Angus Scrimm as Dr. Chandler
 Scheana Shay as Angel Tomlin
 Justin Shilton as Robinson McGraw
 Mark Simich as Davis Bennett
 Aiden Simko as Chaz
 Joe Slaughter as Roger Reynolds
 Melissa Soso as Girl coming out of the elevator
 Hollie Stenson as Abby
 Robin Sydney as Lindsey
 Colin Tary as Andy
 Jennifer Thompson as Ace's New Girl
 Diana Elizabeth Torres as Lydia Gonzales / El Jefe
 Elena Tovar as Elena Machado
 Tyson Turrou as Doug
 Tiffany Tynes as Tina Hendricks
 Ilia Volok as Dimitri Uzi Olesky
 Jasmine Waltz as Tara
 Heidi Marie Wanser as Max's Girlfriend
 Christopher Warner as Detective Brody
 Drew Waters as Robert Burke
 Charlie Weber as Ace
 Kit Willesee as Lacey Rivers
 Jason Wishnov as Man on Couch

Episodes

Season 1 (2011)

Season 2 (2012)

Home media
Entertainment One released Femme Fatales: The Complete 1st Season in a 3-disc DVD set on January 29, 2013. The set's featurettes also included footage from Season 2, which in turn was released in a 3-disc DVD set on July 16, 2013.

Soundtrack
A soundtrack album for the series, with music composed and conducted by Joe Kraemer, was released on May 29, 2012, by MovieScore Media.

References

External links

 

2011 American television series debuts
2012 American television series endings
2010s American mystery television series
2010s American anthology television series
Cinemax original programming
Television series by Warner Bros. Television Studios
Erotic television series
American thriller television series